, also written as (120178) 2003 OP32, is a trans-Neptunian object (TNO) that resides in the Kuiper belt. It was discovered on July 26, 2003 by Michael E. Brown, Chad Trujillo and David L. Rabinowitz at Palomar Mountain in California.

Origin

The neutral color of the spectrum of these objects in the visible range evidences a lack of complex organics on the surface of these bodies that has been studied in detail for the surface of Haumea.

References

External links 
 (120178) 2003 OP32 Precovery Images
 

Haumea family
Classical Kuiper belt objects
2003 OP32
2003 OP32
2003 OP32
20030726